Ilango Adigal was a monk and a poet, sometimes identified as a Chera prince. He is traditionally credited as the author of Cilappatikaram, one of the Five Great Epics of Ancient Tamil literature. He is one of the greatest poets from Cheranadu (now Kerala). In a patikam (prologue) to the epic poem, he identifies himself as the brother of a famous Chera king Ceṅkuṭṭuvan (Senguttuvan). This Chera king, as stated by Elizabeth Rosen, ruled over his kingdom in late 2nd or early 3rd century CE. However, this is doubtful because a Sangam poem in Patiṟṟuppattu – the fifth ten – provides a biography of Ceṅkuṭṭuvan, his family and rule, but never mentions that he had a brother who became an ascetic or wrote one of the most cherished epics. This has led scholars to conclude that the legendary author Ilango Adikal myth was likely inserted later into the epic. In a 1968 note, Kamil Zvelebil suggested that, "this [Adigal claim] may be a bit of poetic fantasy, practised perhaps by a later member of the Chera Dynasty [5th or 6th century] recalling earlier events [2nd or 3rd century]".

Biography
Iḷaṅkō Aṭikaḷ (lit. "the venerable ascetic prince"), also spelled Ilango Adigal or Ilangovadigal, is traditionally believed to be the author of Chilappatikaram. No direct verifiable information is available about him. He is believed to have been a prince who became a Jain ascetic based on a patikam (prologue) composed and interpolated into the epic many centuries later. Ilango is considered the younger son of Chera king Nedum Cheralatan and Sonai/Nalchonai of the Chola dynasty. His elder brother is believed to be Senguttuvan, the reputed warrior-king. The young Ilango chose to forgo the royal life because a priest had told the royal court that the younger prince will succeed his father, and Ilango wanted to prove him wrong. However, these traditional beliefs are doubtful because the Sangam era text Patiṟṟuppattu provides a biography of king Nedum Cheralatan and of king Senguttuvan, and in neither is Ilango Adigal ever mentioned.

The author was a Jaina scholar, as in several parts of the epic, the key characters of the epic meet a Jaina monk or nun. The last canto of the epic, lines 155-178, mentions "I also went in", whose "I" scholars have assumed to be the author Adigal. The epic also mentions, among other details, the "Gajabahu synchronism".

These verses state Adikal attended the animal sacrifice by king Senguttuvan in the presence of Gajabahu, someone believed to have been the king of Ceylon (Sri Lanka) between 171 and 193 CE. This has led to the proposals that Adikal lived in the same period. These lines also mention that he became a sannyasi in a monastery outside Vanci – the capital of the 2nd-century Chera kingdom (now parts of Kerala). This declaration has been interpreted as renouncing and becoming a Jain monk.

According to Kamil Zvelebil, all this must have been a fraudulent statement added by Ilango Adikal to remain a part of the collective memory in the epic he wrote. Adikal was likely a Jain who lived a few centuries later, states Zvelebil, and his epic "cannot have been composed before the 5th- or 6th-century".

Gananath Obeyesekere – a scholar of Buddhism, Sri Lankan religious history and anthropology, considers the epic's claims of Gajabahu and the kinship between Ilango Adigal and Senguttuvan to be ahistorical, and that these lines are likely "a late interpolation" into the Tamil epic. The author was likely not a prince, nor had anything to do with the Chera dynasty, says R Parthasarathy, and these lines may have been added to the epic to give the text a high pedigree status, gain royal support, and to "institutionalize the worship of goddess Pattini and her temples" in the Tamil regions (modern Kerala and Tamil Nadu) as is described in the epic.

According to another Tamil legend, an astrologer predicted that he would become the ruler of the land. To stop this, and let his elder brother be the king, the prince became a Jain monk taking the name of Ilango Adigal.

Legacy 
The Chilappatikaram epic credited to Ilango Adigal inspired another Chera-Tamil poetic epic called Manimekalai. This poetic epic acts as a sequel to Chilappatikaram. It revolves around the daughter of Kovalan (the protagonist of Chilappatikaram) and Madhavi (who had an affair with Kovalan in Chilappatikaram), named Manimekalai. Although Manimekalai's mother was Madhavi, she worshipped goddess Pattini (Kannaki, Kovalan's wife).

See also
 Five Great Epics
 Tamil literature

References

Bibliography

External links
 

Tamil epic poets
Indian Jain monks
2nd-century Indian Jains
2nd-century Jain monks
2nd-century Indian monks
2nd-century Indian poets

Silappatikaram
Indian male poets